The Linden Formation is a geologic formation in Tennessee. It preserves fossils dating back to the Devonian period.

See also

 List of fossiliferous stratigraphic units in Tennessee
 Paleontology in Tennessee

References
 

Devonian geology of Tennessee